Talha Chahour is a Pakistani actor known for his work in theatre and television. He rose to prominence after his portrayal of Capt. Z. I. Farrukh in the political-thriller Jo Bichar Gaye (2021–22), for which he received a nomination of Best Emerging Talent in TV at the 21st Lux Style Awards.

Early life 

Chahour was born and raised in Rahim Yar Khan, Pakistan. He belongs to a Punjabi-Muslim family and is the youngest of six siblings. His father Akhtar Chahour is a lawyer and a member of the Punjab Bar Council. Talha moved to Lahore when he was fifteen where he studied at Government College University, Lahore and graduated in Political Science in 2018.

Career

Early career 

After being part of the dramatics club of his college, Chahour began his career in theatre. He appeared in over 400 theatrical performances with the Ajoka Theater group. Some of his plays include Dara, Bullah, Lo Phir Basant Aayi, Tiger of Mysore, Anhi Main Da Sufna, Macbeth and Bhagat Singh. Chahour also travelled with this theatre goup to the United States and India, performing in several cities.

Achievements 
Chahour became the General Secretary of GCDC (Government College Dramatics Club) in his last year of college i.e. 2017-18. He conducted several acting workshops in GCU's amphitheatre. He was awarded the Roll of Honour for serving in the GCDC.

Television debut and breakthrough 
Chahour's big breakthrough performance on television came in December 2021 with Haissam Hussain's political thriller Jo Bichar Gaye which was based on the fall of Dhaka. Chahour played the protagonist Capt. Z. I. Farrukh, on whose memoirs the series was based. Jo Bichar Gaye is Hussain's second historical drama following Dastaan and earned Chahour critical appreciation, besides a nomination of Best Emerging Talent in TV at the Lux Style Awards. A reviewer from Dawn Images praised his performance stating, "Chahour's undeniable screen presence brings to mind the classic heroes of the past."

Lead roles 
Chahour is currently starring in Hum TV's Wabaal where he plays Faraz opposite Sarah Khan. He will be next seen in Haseeb Hassan's directional and Umera Ahmad's written Jannat Se Aagey as Farooq, alongside Kubra Khan, Gohar Rasheed and Ramsha Khan. Just recently, it was also announced that Talha Chahour and Iqra Aziz will star in Syed Wajahat Hussain's next drama Mannat Murad. This play is written by Nadia Akhtar and Talha will be playing the character of Murad.

Awards 
Chahour has won an Indian Academy Award in Theatre from the Ministry of Chandigarh. He also won a Naatshala Award from the Government of Amritsar, India.

Television

Awards and nominations

References

External links 
 

Living people
Pakistani television actors
1997 births